Jaime Llave (March 22, 1926 – November 27, 1996) better known by his screen name Balot, was a Filipino comedian, film, television and stage actor in the Philippines.

Career
Balot started his career as a Bodabil stage actor at the Manila Grand Opera House.  He shifted to movies first appearing in a love story-drama movie titled Aklat ng Pag-ibig.  His popularity increased after he started doing comedic roles.  He was cast as one of the regulars on the original Super Laff-In TV show on ABS-CBN station in 1969. The popular sketch comedy show abruptly ended after Martial law was imposed in 1972, stopping almost all TV broadcasts in the country.  After the show ended, the stocky actor continued appearing on movies or as guest on several TV shows usually appearing in supporting roles as the father figure, househelp, the neighbor, or an avid cockfighter with a kerchief wrapped around his signature crew cut.

Personal life
Balot was married to comedian Matimtiman Cruz.  He died in 1996 due to complications from diabetes; he was 70 years old.

Filmography

Film

Television

References

External links
 
Ogie Alcasid's list of comedy greats of Philippine Cinema from Philippine Entertainment Portal

1926 births
1996 deaths
20th-century comedians
20th-century Filipino male actors
Filipino male comedians
Male actors from Manila